Dmitry Olegovich Maltsev (Мальцев, Дмитрий Олегович; born January 20, 1991) is a Russian professional ice hockey forward. He is currently playing with Metallurg Novokuznetsk of the Supreme Hockey League (VHL).

Maltsev made his Kontinental Hockey League (KHL) debut playing with Lokomotiv Yaroslavl during the 2012–13 KHL season.

References

External links

1991 births
Living people
Avangard Omsk players
Lokomotiv Yaroslavl players
Metallurg Novokuznetsk players
Russian ice hockey forwards
Salavat Yulaev Ufa players
HC Sochi players
Sportspeople from Omsk